Ebb Tide is a 1932 British drama film directed by Arthur Rosson and starring Dorothy Bouchier, Joan Barry, George Barraud, and Merle Oberon. It was shot at Elstree Studios and on location in London. The film's sets were designed by the art director Holmes Paul. It was produced and distributed by the British branch of Paramount Pictures as a quota quickie. It was based on the novel God Gave Me Twenty Cents by Dixie Willson, which had previously been made into a 1926 American silent film of the same title.

Plot
A sailor falls in love with a woman he meets at the dockside, but is deeply conflicted because his former lover is in prison.

Cast
 Dorothy Bouchier as Cassie
 Joan Barry as 	Mary
 George Barraud as 	Steve
 Vanda Gréville as 	Millie
 Alexander Field as Barney
 Annie Esmond as Landlady
 Merle Oberon as 	Girl 
 Leonard Shepherd as Tom James

References

Bibliography
 Chibnall, Steve. Quota Quickies: The Birth of the British 'B' Film. British Film Institute, 2007.
 Low, Rachael. Filmmaking in 1930s Britain. George Allen & Unwin, 1985.
 Wood, Linda. British Films, 1927-1939. British Film Institute, 1986.

External links

1932 films
1930s English-language films
1932 drama films
British drama films
Films directed by Arthur Rosson
British black-and-white films
Films shot at Imperial Studios, Elstree
1930s British films
Paramount Pictures films
Films shot in London
Quota quickies
Sound film remakes of silent films